Tobias Christensen (born 11 May 2000) is a Norwegian professional footballer who plays as a midfielder for Hungarian club Fehérvár.

Club career

Early career
Christensen played for Vigør through 2015, before joining Start ahead of the 2016 season. He made his Eliteserien debut in March 2018 against Tromsø.

Molde
In August 2019, Christensen signed for Molde. He made his debut for the club when he came in as a 70th minute substitute in a 2–2 draw away against Odd. On 24 November 2019, he scored his first goal for Molde in their 4−2 win against Vålerenga.

Fehérvár
On 3 January 2023, Christensen signed a contract with Fehérvár in Hungary until June 2025.

Career statistics

Honours
Molde
Eliteserien: 2019

References

2000 births
Sportspeople from Kristiansand
Living people
Norwegian footballers
Norway youth international footballers
Norway under-21 international footballers
Association football defenders
FK Vigør players
IK Start players
Molde FK players
Vålerenga Fotball players
Fehérvár FC players
Eliteserien players
Norwegian First Division players
Nemzeti Bajnokság I players
Norwegian expatriate footballers
Expatriate footballers in Hungary
Norwegian expatriate sportspeople in Hungary